Lake Meredith Estates is an unincorporated community and census-designated place in Hutchinson County, Texas, United States. Its population was 437 as of the 2010 census.

Geography

References

Unincorporated communities in Hutchinson County, Texas
Unincorporated communities in Texas
Census-designated places in Hutchinson County, Texas
Census-designated places in Texas